The Wolfe House is a historic cottage in Terry, Mississippi. It was built in 1852 on land owned by the Terry family, and it was designed in the Greek Revival architectural style. It is listed on the National Register of Historic Places.

History
The cottage was built in 1852 for W. D. Terry, a large cotton planter, as a rental property. Terry had inherited over 600 acres from his father, Joseph M. Terry. The property remained in the Terry family until 1868.

From 1904 to 1956, the cottage belonged to the Wolfe family. It was subsequently acquired by Lewis Grubbs, followed by the Bass family.

Architectural significance
The cottage was designed in the Greek Revival architectural style. It has been listed on the National Register of Historic Places since June 22, 1989.

References

Houses on the National Register of Historic Places in Mississippi
National Register of Historic Places in Hinds County, Mississippi
Greek Revival architecture in Mississippi
Houses completed in 1852